Prime Hook National Wildlife Refuge is a sanctuary for migratory birds located east of Milton, Delaware, United States. It was established by President John F. Kennedy in 1963 on  along the western shore of Delaware Bay. The refuge contains a variety of habitats, including freshwater and salt marshes, woodlands, grasslands, ponds, and forested areas, supporting 267 species of birds and a variety of reptiles, amphibians and mammals.

Fowler Beach, along the Eastern edge of the refuge, is an official sanctuary for horseshoe crabs, the state marine animal of Delaware and a "signature species" of the Delaware Bay Estuary.

The refuge is open to the public for wildlife-oriented recreation. Facilities include walking trails, a canoe trail, a bird blind and other wildlife observation areas, and a visitor center.

See also
List of National Wildlife Refuges of the United States

References

External links
 Prime Hook NWR - Official site

National Wildlife Refuges in Delaware
Protected areas of Sussex County, Delaware
IUCN Category IV
Protected areas established in 1963
1963 establishments in Delaware
Wetlands of Delaware
Landforms of Sussex County, Delaware